Macdara is an Irish first name that originates from a Christian saint, Macdara, who lived off the western coast of Ireland on a remote island over 1,500 years ago. His own first name was Sinach. According to a 1999 article in the New York Times, St. Macdara’s Island "was home in the sixth century to St. Macdara, Connemara's most respected saint, who built a one-room chapel here" which is "considered one of the finest early Christian oratories in Ireland".

Today in Ireland, the name Macdara is quite rare as a first name. One of the most prominent modern uses of the name is a second-level school located in the south of Dublin city named St Mac Dara's College.

The spelling of the name has a number of different variations including Macdarragh and Macdarra. Mac is Irish for Son and Dara is Irish for Oak so the literal translation of Macdara is Son of Oak. A new innovation without historic pedigree is for the name to be spelled as one word with a capital "D" as in MacDara.

People
 Macdara Ó Fátharta, Irish actor
 Macdara Woods, Irish poet

Notes

External links
 Cruach—na—Caurra (Saint Mac Dara's Island)

People from County Galway
Medieval Irish saints
Irish-language masculine given names